Coffman Cove (Lingít: Tatxánk) is a city in Prince of Wales-Hyder Census Area, Alaska, in the United States. It is located on Prince of Wales Island.  The population was 176 at the 2010 census, down from 199 in 2000.

Geography
Coffman Cove is located at  (56.012137, -132.828840).

Demographics

Coffman Cove first appeared on the 1980 U.S. Census as a census-designated place (CDP). It was incorporated as a city in 1989.

As of the census of 2000, there were 199 people, 63 households, and 42 families residing in the city.  The population density was 19.2 people per square mile (7.4/km).  There were 99 housing units at an average density of 9.5 per square mile (3.7/km).  The racial makeup of the city was 87.44% White, 0.50% Black or African American, 2.51% Native American, 0.50% Asian, 5.03% from other races, and 4.02% from two or more races.  1.01% of the population were Hispanic or Latino of any race.

There were 63 households, out of which 31.7% had children under the age of 18 living with them, 54.0% were married couples living together, 4.8% had a female householder with no husband present, and 33.3% were non-families. 25.4% of all households were made up of individuals, and 6.3% had someone living alone who was 65 years of age or older.  The average household size was 2.56 and the average family size was 3.00.

In the city, the age distribution of the population shows 21.1% under the age of 18, 7.5% from 18 to 24, 32.7% from 25 to 44, 32.2% from 45 to 64, and 6.5% who were 65 years of age or older.  The median age was 40 years. For every 100 females, there were 168.9 males.  For every 100 females age 18 and over, there were 180.4 males.

The median income for a household in the city was $43,750, and the median income for a family was $44,861. Males had a median income of $52,031 versus $31,250 for females. The per capita income for the city was $23,249.  About 6.7% of families and 4.9% of the population were below the poverty line, including none of those under the age of eighteen and 21.4% of those 65 or over.

Climate 
Usual for Southeast Alaska, it has either an oceanic climate  (Köppen climate classification: Cfb) using the -3 °C isotherm or a warm-summer humid continental climate  (Köppen climate classification: Dfb) when the 0 °C isotherm is utilised. Also usual for Southeast Alaska, the area is a temperate rainforest, with high levels of precipitation, as well as mild summers alongside cold winters (although mild by Alaskan standards, especially when compared to cities like Fairbanks).

Transportation

Air
Klawock Airport is the only airport on Prince of Wales Island serving wheeled aircraft. Regular scheduled and charter float planes provide service to many of the island's coastal communities, including Coffman Cove.  Scheduled service to Coffman Cove is provided by Taquan Air.

Ferry
On March 12, 2009, the Inter-Island Ferry Authority announced that ferry service to Coffman Cove would be suspended for the remainder of 2009.

As of June 2020, one can take the ferry into Coffman Cove with the Alaska Marine Hi-way from Bellingham Washington or Prince Rupert Canada with connections in Ketchikan Alaska on the Inter Island Authority (IFA) into Hollis.

Roads
Prince of Wales island's road system is composed primarily of forest logging roads, with the more heavily traveled routes between island communities upgraded. Many of the roads on the island have been upgraded and paved. Coffman Cove and other communities are now connected by wide, modern roads well bedded, paved with asphalt.

Shuttles and taxis
There are a few shuttle bus or taxi cab companies (based in Craig & Klawock) providing regular service between Coffman Cove & the Hollis ferry terminal and the other island communities.

Education
Southeast Island School District operates Howard Valentine Coffman Cove School.

References

External links

Coffman Cove connection information from Inter-Island Ferry Authority

Cities in Alaska
Cities in Prince of Wales–Hyder Census Area, Alaska
Cities in Unorganized Borough, Alaska
Populated coastal places in Alaska on the Pacific Ocean